Karl Johan Siward Mjällby (born 9 February 1971) is a Swedish football manager and former professional player who played as a centre back. He represented AIK, Celtic, and Levante during a career that spanned between 1989 and 2006. A full international between 1997 and 2004, he won 49 caps and scored 4 goals for the Sweden national team. Mjällby was the team captain during the 2002 FIFA World Cup, and also took part in UEFA Euro 2000 and 2004. He has been assistant manager of Bolton Wanderers and Celtic, working alongside former Celtic team-mate and manager Neil Lennon.

Playing career

Early career
Early on in Mjällby's sporting career he played both football and tennis and had the choice to turn professional in either. He made the decision to prioritise football and was signed by AIK in 1984 from IK Bele.

AIK
Mjällby spent the next fourteen years in AIK and established himself in the side with solid performances as a no-nonsense tackling midfield player. His performances at club level were noticed and he soon broke through to the Sweden national team. Although he was a squad member in 1992 when AIK won the league, he refused to accept the gold medal, stating that he felt he had not contributed enough. Therefore, it was a great day when lifelong AIK supporter Mjällby got his silverware in 1998 when he guided the club to a new league victory.

Celtic FC
His solid performances for club and country caught the eye of Jozef Venglos, coach at Celtic. In November 1998 Mjällby signed for Celtic for a fee of around £1,200,000 and was given 35 as his squad number, which he retained throughout his time at Celtic. Mjällby arrived at the club one year after compatriot and international team mate Henrik Larsson and they departed the club the same year in 2004. He made his debut for the Scottish side in the famous 5–1 victory over archrivals Rangers in the role of central defence. The rest of season 1998–99 saw Mjällby play increasingly in the role of central defence, a role in which he grew to prominence.

The 1999–2000 season saw Venglos move into the role of a scout with John Barnes coming in as head coach and Kenny Dalglish as director of football. Mjällby again took up his midfield role in Barnes' ill-fated 4–2–2–2 formation. He returned to his by now accustomed defensive role under Dalglish following the departure of Barnes in January 2000. It was under Dalglish that Mjällby won his first honour at Celtic in the League Cup win over Aberdeen.

Season 2000–01 saw Martin O'Neill replace interim manager Kenny Dalglish. Mjällby found himself a mainstay on the left hand side of O'Neill's three-man defence alongside Joos Valgaeren, Tom Boyd and/or Bobo Baldé. He was to pick up a further three medals as Celtic won the Domestic Treble of the Scottish Premier League, League Cup, and Scottish Cup.

It was in 2001–02 that Mjällby experienced his first taste of Champions League football in matches against FC Porto, Juventus and Rosenborg. Another Scottish Premier League title was added to his growing medal haul.

2002–03 saw Celtic, with Mjällby as prominent figure reach the final of the UEFA Cup. They lost out to FC Porto 3–2 aet. Celtic also went on to lose the Scottish Premier League and League Cup to Rangers.

Season 2003–04 was Mjällby's last at Celtic Park. After struggling with injury throughout most of the season, he decided to turn down Celtic's offer of a one-year deal.

Throughout his six years at Celtic Park he picked up 3 Scottish Premier League Winner's medals, 2 League Cup Winner's medals, 2 Scottish Cup Winner's medals, 2 Scottish Cup Runners Up medals, 1 League Cup Runners Up medal and 1 UEFA Cup Runners Up medal as well as featuring in the Champions League Competition of seasons, 2001–02 and 2002–03. During his time at Celtic, Mjällby captained the team on several occasions. Mjällby enjoyed a good relationship with the Celtic support in his time at the club and was often referred to as "Dolph" or "Big Dolph" given his perceived resemblance to his countryman, actor Dolph Lundgren.

Levante UD
Mjällby was signed by newly promoted Spanish La Liga side Levante, signing a two-year contract. However, he did not enjoy the same level of success as he had in Scotland and was forced to retire, having failed to recover from two operations on his knee.

Return to AIK and retirement
Following his retirement Mjällby returned home to Sweden. After almost a year out of the game he made comeback and signed once again for his boyhood favourites AIK.

However, on 16 May 2006 he was forced to retire from professional football due to his injury.

International career

Early career 
Mjällby made 7 appearances for the Sweden U21 team before making his senior debut for Sweden on 12 March 1997 in a friendly game against Israel. He made his competitive debut for Sweden in a UEFA Euro 2000 qualifier against England, in which he also scored his first international goal.

Euro 2000 
At UEFA Euro 2000, Mjällby scored for Sweden in the opening match against Belgium, taking the ball after an error by Belgian goalkeeper Filip De Wilde. Although reducing Belgium's 2–0 lead from Bart Goor and Emile Mpenza to 2–1, Sweden failed to score an equalising goal and lost the game.

2002 World Cup 
He captained Sweden at the 2002 FIFA World Cup after fellow defender Patrik Andersson had to withdraw because of injury. Mjällby formed a solid partnership with Andreas Jakobsson when Sweden won Group F ahead of England, Argentina, and Nigeria, before being eliminated by Senegal in the second round.

Euro 2004 and retirement 
Two years later Mjällby was in the squad for Euro 2004 but did not make any appearances. He made his last international appearance on 9 October 2004 in a 2006 FIFA World Cup qualifier against Hungary. In total Mjällby won a total of 49 caps, scoring 4 goals.

Coaching career
On 25 March 2010, it was announced that Mjällby would assume the role of assistant manager at Celtic Football Club, alongside temporary boss, and former team-mate, Neil Lennon. The appointment of Lennon and Mjällby was made after the sacking of Tony Mowbray as Celtic manager after a poor 2009–10 season for the club, culminating in a 4–0 defeat against St Mirren.

When asked about the appointment by reporters, Mjällby stated, "Neil is like myself. He has a will-to-win and that is what we are both looking to instill in the current Celtic team. We want our players to go out on the park, and on the training pitch, and to wear that Celtic jersey with pride." On 1 July 2010, Mjällby was confirmed as Neil Lennon's assistant manager at Celtic.

On 22 April 2014, it was announced that Mjällby would leave Celtic at the end of the season to look for new challenges in football.

On 12 October 2014, he was appointed as the Assistant Manager at Bolton Wanderers linking up again with his former Celtic colleagues Neil Lennon and Garry Parker. In September 2015, he stepped down from his role at Bolton citing personal reasons and was replaced by Steve Walford.

In February 2016, Mjällby became head coach of Swedish Division 1 team Västerås SK.

Career statistics

Club 

*Appearances in Mästerskapsserien.

International 
Appearances and goals by national team and year

International goals

Honours
AIK
Allsvenskan: 1992, 1998
Svenska Cupen: 1995–96, 1996–97

Celtic
Scottish Premier League: 2000–01, 2001–02, 2003–04
Scottish League Cup: 1999–2000, 2000–01
Scottish Cup: 2000–01, 2003–04
UEFA Cup runner-up: 2002–03

References

1971 births
Living people
Footballers from Stockholm
Association football defenders
Swedish footballers
Sweden international footballers
Celtic F.C. players
AIK Fotboll players
Levante UD footballers
Scottish Premier League players
Allsvenskan players
La Liga players
UEFA Euro 2000 players
2002 FIFA World Cup players
UEFA Euro 2004 players
Expatriate footballers in Scotland
Expatriate footballers in Spain
Swedish expatriate sportspeople in Spain
Swedish expatriate sportspeople in the United Kingdom
Swedish expatriate footballers
Celtic F.C. non-playing staff
Bolton Wanderers F.C. non-playing staff